The Mitimele is a river of southwestern mainland Equatorial Guinea. It forms part of the Muni Estuary along with the Mitong River, Mandyani River, Congue River, Utamboni River and Mven River. The river becomes the Utamboni River along the border with Gabon.

References

Rivers of Equatorial Guinea